The following ships of the Indian Navy have been named INS Betwa:

  was a Type 41  launched in 1959 and broken up after 1988
  is a  guided-missile frigate launched in 1998

Indian Navy ship names